Roshel (Roshel Smart Armored Vehicles) is a Canadian manufacturer of wheeled armored vehicles and armored fighting vehicles.

As part of military aid following the Russian invasion of Ukraine on February 24 2022, the Canadian government has donated 8 Roshel Senator APCs to the Ukrainian Ground Forces. 
On 18 January 2023, the Canadian government announced a further donation of another 200 Roshel Senator APCs.

References

External links

 

2016 establishments in Canada
Defence companies of Canada
Military vehicle manufacturers
Motor vehicle manufacturers of Canada
Companies based in Mississauga
Mississauga
Vehicle manufacturing companies established in 2016